Pigiopsis is a genus of moths in the family Geometridae erected by Warren in 1899.

Species
Pigiopsis convergens Warren, 1899 Uganda
Pigiopsis scotoides Prout, 1915 Cameroon
Pigiopsis hyposcotia Prout, 1915 Cameroon

References

Geometridae